Daniel Arcas Aznar is a Grand Prix motorcycle racer from Spain.

Career statistics

By season

Races by year
(key)

References

External links
 Profile on motogp.com

1990 births
Living people
Spanish motorcycle racers
Motorcycle racers from Catalonia
250cc World Championship riders
Sportspeople from Barcelona